Weston is a census-designated place located in the southeastern portion of Hazel Dell Township in Pottawattamie County in the state of Iowa. As of the 2020 census the population was 78.

Its location is almost exactly between the cities of Council Bluffs and Underwood near Interstate 80.

Demographics
As of the 2020 United States census, Weston had a population of 78.

History

Weston's population in 1925 was 92 in 1925.

References

Unincorporated communities in Pottawattamie County, Iowa
Unincorporated communities in Iowa
Census-designated places in Pottawattamie County, Iowa